Pašilaičiai is an eldership in the Vilnius City Municipality, Lithuania. It occupies 7,9  km². According to the 2011 census, it has a population of 33,056.

References

Neighbourhoods of Vilnius